Betsey Johnson (born August 10, 1942), is an American fashion designer best known for her feminine and whimsical designs. Many of her designs are considered "over the top" and embellished. She also is known for doing a cartwheel ending in a split at the end of her fashion shows.

Early life and education
Johnson was born in Wethersfield, Connecticut, the second of three children born to Lena and John Johnson. She has an elder sister, Sally, and a younger brother, Robert. Johnson grew up in Terryville, Connecticut, and took many dance classes, which inspired her love of costumes.

Following her graduation from high school, Johnson studied at the Pratt Institute and then later graduated Phi Beta Kappa from Syracuse University, where she was a member of the Alpha Xi Delta women's sorority. After graduation, she spent a summer as an intern at Mademoiselle magazine, where she was mentored by Edie Locke.

Career
Johnson's fashion career started after she entered and won the Mademoiselle Guest Editor Contest. Within a year, she was the in-house designer for Manhattan boutique Paraphernalia. Johnson became part of both the youthquake fashion movement and Andy Warhol's underground scene, along with The Velvet Underground, Edie Sedgwick, Nico, and Lou Reed. In 1969, she opened a boutique called Betsey Bunky Nini on New York City's Upper East Side. Edie Sedgwick was her house model and Johnson designed the clothing Sedgwick wore on her last film, Ciao! Manhattan. 

In the 1970s, Johnson took control of the fashion label "Alley Cat" which was popular with the rock 'n roll musicians of the day. In her first year, her debut collection for Alley Cat reportedly sold $5 million in volume. In September 1971 she received the Coty Fashion Critics' Award (a 'Winnie').

In 1978, Johnson started her own fashion line. Her second collection did not sell well, leaving her with 3,000 pieces of spring clothing and insufficient funds to stage a 1981 fashion show to sell them and Johnson opened a retail store in the SoHo area of New York City. She designed the dress that Lisa Loeb wore in the music video for her 1994 hit "Stay (I Missed You)".

In 2002, Johnson was inducted into the Fashion Walk of Fame. Her bronze plaque held one of her original sketches. In 2003, she expanded her line for 2004 to include handbags, accessories, hats, and scarves.

In 2008, Johnson was a contributor to Carrie Borzillo-Vrenna's book Cherry Bomb.

The National Arts Club awarded Johnson the 2009 Medal of Honor for Lifetime Achievement in Fashion. She once described her style as a formula: "Take a leotard and add a skirt." As of 2011, she has more than 65 stores worldwide.

In September 2010, her Spring/Summer 2011 Ready-to-Wear fashion show generated a lot of buzz before it started because models were rumored to come down the runway riding bicycles. However, the original concept proved too dangerous during the rehearsals, so Betsey asked model Kim Matulova to ride a skateboard while wearing open-toed platform heels instead. She ended up falling to the ground and losing one of her shoes, and she had to get off and shoulder her skateboard all the way back up the catwalk.

On April 26, 2012, Betsey Johnson, LLC filed voluntarily for Chapter 11 bankruptcy protection.

On September 12, 2012, she celebrated 40 years of her brand with a retrospective fashion show with Cyndi Lauper performing.

As of May 2013, Johnson and her daughter Lulu Johnson have a reality TV show that airs on the Style Network.

On September 4, 2014, it was announced that Johnson would be one of the celebrities competing on the 19th season of Dancing with the Stars. The couple was eliminated in week 4, finishing in tenth place.

In 2018, Johnson appeared on Sugar Rush as a guest judge (Episode: "Frosted Fashion").

In 2022, Johnson appeared on RuPaul's Drag Race All Stars as a guest judge (Episode: "Legendary Legend Looks").

Personal life
Johnson is a long-term breast cancer survivor.

See also 

 André Courrèges
 Diana Dew
 Rudi Gernreich
 Tiger Morse
 Mary Quant
 Paco Rabanne

References

External links

 
 
 
 Betsey Johnson: America's 25 most Fascinating Entrepreneurs
 Betsey Johnson: New York Fashion Designer
 Women Making History: Betsey Johnson 

1942 births
Living people
American fashion designers
People from Wethersfield, Connecticut
Pratt Institute alumni
Syracuse University alumni
21st-century American politicians
People from Terryville, Connecticut
American women fashion designers
1970s fashion
1990s fashion
2000s fashion
21st-century American women